Cape D'Aguilar Marine Reserve is the only Marine Reserve (distinct from Marine Parks) in Hong Kong. It is located at the far south-east corner of Hong Kong Island and covers an area of just , mainly between Kau Pei Chau and the rocky coastline. It was designated in July 1996 under the Marine Parks Ordinance to protect the rocky shores and the subtidal habitats in the area.

Cape D'Aguilar Marine Reserve is managed by the Agriculture, Fisheries and Conservation Department (AFCD) with on-site assistance from the Swire Institute of Marine Science, a research faculty of the University of Hong Kong.

History

In 1991, the area was designated a Site of Special Scientific Interest (SSSI) by the Government. In 1996, it became the only Marine Reserve in Hong Kong.

Rules in the reserve
Fishing, swimming, diving and collecting organisms are strictly prohibited in the marine reserve and a permit must be obtained from the AFCD before conducting research there.

See also
 Cape D'Aguilar

References

External links

 The Biodiversity of Cape D'Aguilar

Marine parks of Hong Kong
Southern District, Hong Kong
Marine reserves
1996 establishments in Hong Kong
Protected areas established in 1996